The United Arab Emirates competed at the 2017 World Games held in Wrocław, Poland.

Medalists

Air sports 

Cornelia Mihai won the bronze medal in the parachuting canopy piloting event.

Ju-jitsu 

Faisal Al-Ketbi won the gold medal in the men's ne-waza 94 kg event and the silver medal in the men's ne-waza open event.

References 

Nations at the 2017 World Games
2017 in Emirati sport
2017